Girl You Know It’s True is an upcoming biographical film about the controversial music duo Milli Vanilli. Written, directed and produced by Simon Verhoeven, the bio-pic has Elan Ben Ali and Tijan Njie playing the group’s frontmen Fabrice Morvan  and Rob Pilatus. Matthias Schweighöfer plays the group’s manager Frank Farian with Farian a producer of the project.

Synopsis
Grammy award winning music act Milli Vanilli become the first act to have their award stripped from them after they are exposed as a fake enterprise with the singers lip-syncing to pre-recorded tracks.

Cast
Elan Ben Ali as Fabrice Morvan
Tijan Njie as Rob Pilatus
Matthias Schweighofer as Frank Farian
Graham Rogers as Todd Headley
Bella Dayne as Milli

Production

Development
In August 2022 it was revealed that Leonine Studios were filming a bio-pic of troubled 1980s music group Milli Vanilli. Writer and director of the project Simon Verhoeven was named as producer. Also producing are Quirin Berg and Max Wiedemann as well as Frank Farian and Stefan Gärtner. Associate producers include Brad Howell and Jasmin Davis, daughter of the late John Davis, who along with Howell were the hidden singers in the band. Also associate producer is Todd Headlee, the sister of the late Rob Pilatus, Carmen Pilatus, and Ingrid Segieth. Kevin Liles was listed as an executive producer. Additional production is coming from Wiedemann & Berg Film, Sentana Film, SevenPictures and Mediawan.

Casting
Matthias Schweighöfer was confirmed as playing the group’s producer Frank Farian with Elan Ben Ali and Tijan Njie appearing as the Milli Vanilli front men Fabrice Morvan and Rob Pilatus. In September 2022, roles were announced for Graham Rogers and Bella Dayne.

Filming
Filming was announced to take place in Munich, Berlin, and Los Angeles as well as Capetown, South Africa  The South Africa leg of filming was slated to start in October 2022, with filming expected to continue until the end of the year. Filming was confirmed to have wrapped in December 2022, and in February 2023 Voltage Pictures were announced to have acquired worldwide sales (excluding Germany) and were taking the film to the European Film Market.

Release
The film is expected to be released towards the end of 2023.

References

External links

Biographical films
Upcoming English-language films
Milli Vanilli